William E. and Frederica M. Zuendt House, also known as the Johnson House, is a historic home located in Jefferson City, Cole County, Missouri. It was built in 1913, and is a two-story, three bay, Colonial Revival style brick dwelling on a stone foundation. It has a slate hipped roof with dormer window.  Also on the property is a contributing garage.

It was listed on the National Register of Historic Places in 2002.

References

Houses on the National Register of Historic Places in Missouri
Colonial Revival architecture in Missouri
Houses completed in 1913
Buildings and structures in Jefferson City, Missouri
National Register of Historic Places in Cole County, Missouri